Saint-Léolin is a community on the Acadian Peninsula in Gloucester County, New Brunswick, Canada. It held village status prior to 2023.

History

The first settler to the village was Joseph Bertin in the early 19th century. The village was originally named Saint-Joseph, but changed in 1904 to avoid confusion with another Saint-Joseph near Memramcook.

The village was incorporated in 1978.

On 1 January 2023, Saint-Léolin amalgamated with the three other villages and all or part of four local service districts to form the new of Rivière-du-Nord. The community's name remains in official use.

Demographics 

Notable people

See also
List of communities in New Brunswick

References

External links
 Village de Saint-Léolin

Communities in Gloucester County, New Brunswick
Former villages in New Brunswick